The kings of Adiabene were the rulers of Adiabene, an ancient kingdom which existed in Northern Mesopotamia from the second century BC to the fourth century AD. Adiabene was successively a vassal state of the Seleucid (second century BC), Parthian (second century BC to third century AD) and Sasanian (third to fourth century AD) empires and was geopolitically important since it often found itself located on the frontier between the Iranian empires in the east and the Roman Empire in the west. Though at times equated with ancient Assyria by contemporary authors, the only known ruler of Adiabene of apparent local Mesopotamian descent was the kingdom's first ruler, Abdissares, whose name was of Aramaic origin. The names of the known later kings of Adiabene all appear to be of either Iranian, or in a few cases Greek, origin.

List of kings 
The sequence of kings of Adiabene is known only fragmentarily; breaks where there are no known rulers are marked with horizontal bars in the tables below.

Under the Seleucids and Parthians

Under the Sasanians 
The Sasanian Empire conquered northern Mesopotamia  240. The Sasanians referred to Adiabene as Nōdšīragān or Nōd-Ardaxšīragān. Under Sasanian rule, the kingdom continued to exist as a vassal state, sometimes governed by Sasanian princes, for more than a century. After Ardashir II became king of the Sasanian Empire in 379, no more kings of Adiabene are attested in known sources. Later sources mention only governors of Adiabene, indicating that the kingdom was divided into a set of smaller provinces governed by royally appointed local governors.

Notes

References

Bibliography 

 
Adiabene
Adiabene